Habenaria distans, the hammock bog orchid, is a species of orchid. It is native to Latin America from Mexico to Argentina, as well as Florida, the Greater Antilles, and the Galápagos.

References

distans
Orchids of South America
Orchids of North America
Orchids of Central America
Orchids of Belize
Flora of Florida
Flora of the Caribbean
Plants described in 1866
Flora without expected TNC conservation status